Blackberry City is an unincorporated community in Mingo County, West Virginia, United States. Blackberry City had a post office, which opened on September 2, 1949, and closed on March 17, 1984.

References

Unincorporated communities in Mingo County, West Virginia
Unincorporated communities in West Virginia